Coquainvilliers is a commune in the Calvados department in the Normandy region in northwestern France.

It hosts the Calvados brandy apple distillery Boulard.

Population

International relations
Coquainvilliers is twinned with:
Creech St Michael near Taunton, Somerset, England since 1995.

See also
Communes of the Calvados department

References

External links

Website about Coquainvilliers (3 languages)

Communes of Calvados (department)
Lisieux
Calvados communes articles needing translation from French Wikipedia